"Reggaetón en lo Oscuro" is a song by Puerto Rican reggaeton duo Wisin & Yandel from their album, Los Campeones del Pueblo: The Big Leagues. They co-wrote the song with Luis O'Neill, José Torres, and Jumbo who also produced it with the duo. It was released by Sony Music Latin on October 25, 2018. The single was a commercial success across Latin America. The music video was shot in San Juan and released on October 30, 2018.

Charts

Weekly charts

Year-end charts

Certifications

See also
List of Billboard number-one Latin songs of 2019

References 

2018 songs
2018 singles
Wisin & Yandel songs
Reggaeton songs
Sony Music Latin singles
Spanish-language songs
Songs written by Wisin
Songs written by Yandel